Sviatlana Viktarauna Siarova (born 28 August 1986) is a Belarusian athlete. She competed for Belarus in discus at the 2012 Summer Olympics.

References

Belarusian female discus throwers
Athletes (track and field) at the 2012 Summer Olympics
Olympic athletes of Belarus
1986 births
Living people